The Great Outdoors is a 1988 American comedy film directed by Howard Deutch, written and produced by John Hughes, and starring Dan Aykroyd and John Candy with supporting roles done by Stephanie Faracy, Annette Bening (in her film debut), Chris Young, Lucy Deakins, and Robert Prosky. It tells the story of two families spending their week-long vacation at a lake resort in the fictional town of Pechoggin, Wisconsin with hilarious outcomes. Aykroyd, Candy, and Young reprise their roles from Hughes' previous film, She's Having a Baby.

The film was met with mixed reviews and has gained a cult following.

Plot
Chicagoan Chester "Chet" Ripley, his wife Connie, and their two sons Buckley "Buck" and Ben are spending a week vacationing at Wally and Juanita's Perk's Pine Lodge Resort in Pechoggin, Wisconsin, for the summer. They get a vacation cabin called The Loon's Nest from its owner Wally. All goes as planned until Connie's sister Kate, her investment broker husband Roman Craig, and their twin daughters Mara and Cara arrive uninvited.

Ghost stories after the family BBQ include one of a man-eating grizzly bear that Chet met directly when he was younger. Chet says that while he and Connie were honeymooning at the same lake, he was attacked by a giant grizzly bear. When he fired at it with a shotgun, the buckshot shaved the hair off the top of the bear's head and from then on, it was known as the "Bald-Headed Bear" of Clare County.

After Roman pulls Chet around Lake Potowotominimac on an impromptu water ski ride with his rented speedboat, tensions between the families erupt. Chet is ready to pack up and go home even as his teenage son Buck tries to romance a local girl named Cammie. The budding romance goes well until Chet is challenged to eat a 96-ounce steak called "the Old 96'er" at the restaurant "Paul Bunyan's Cupboard" which causes Buck to break their date. Buck tries to apologize to Cammie for being late, but Cammie refuses to speak to him.

Connie and Kate bond at a local bar when the conversation drifts to Kate's feelings of loneliness with Roman despite their wealth. Later, just at the peak of tension between families, Roman tells of the time at his and Kate's wedding when he overheard a conversation between Chet and their father-in-law describing how they think Roman is a crooked businessman. Roman then tells Chet why he came up to visit: to offer Chet a $25,000 investment opportunity. Feeling guilty from the wedding story, Chet is initially reluctant, but eventually agrees to write Roman a check for the whole amount.

The families say their goodbyes and Roman and his family head back to Chicago. On the car ride home, Kate praises Roman for including Chet in the investment, noting that $25,000 is a lot of money for Chet's family to part with. Now feeling guilty himself, Roman halts the car and returns to the cabin.

Upon his return, Roman confesses that the story about the wedding conversation never happened and that he is broke from some failed investments. His true intention for coming up to the lake was to solicit money from Chet to financially recover.

During a thunderstorm, Kate discovers the twins have gone missing. Chet and Roman find them at the bottom of an old mine shaft, but the claustrophobic Roman is afraid to descend into the tiny space. After some encouragement from Chet, Roman reluctantly climbs down into the mine, while Chet searches for a rope to pull them out. Upon realizing that the mine is stocked with old dynamite, Roman takes his daughters and escapes the shaft on his own.

Upon returning with the rope, Chet is horrified to discover the "Bald-Headed Bear" lurking in the mine. It chases him back to the cabin, smashes through the door, and rampages through the house. Wally bursts in with a loaded shotgun lamp while Roman tries to hold off the animal with a fireplace poker and an oar. Chet takes the shotgun lamp and shoots the bear, blowing the fur off its rear. Roaring in pain, the bear runs out of the house.

The next morning, the families part on amicable terms. Cammie accepts Buck's apologies and they end their brief romance. To Chet's dismay, Connie reveals that she invited the Craigs to stay with them until they can recover. The Ripleys return to Chicago as Chet plans to beat Roman to their house.

During the credits, a deleted scene shows Chet, Connie, Roman, Kate, and Wally in a bar dancing to "Land of a Thousand Dances".

In a post-credits scene, three members of the raccoon family (who rummaged through the trash cans throughout the film) talk in their language about "Jody" sitting in the lake. One of them learns about what happened and another one states that she is now "bald on both ends".

Cast

 Dan Aykroyd as Roman Craig, a supposed investment broker
 John Candy as Chester "Chet" Ripley, the patriarch of his family
 Stephanie Faracy as Connie Ripley, Chet's wife
 Annette Bening as Kate "Katie" Craig, Roman's wife and Connie's younger sister
 Chris Young as Buckley "Buck" Ripley, Chet and Connie's older son
 Lucy Deakins as Cammie, a local girl and A&W waitress who Buck develops a crush on
 Robert Prosky as Wally, the co-owner of "Wally and Juanita's Perk's Pine Lodge Resort" which that the Ripleys and the Craigs stay in
 Ian Giatti as Benjamin "Benny" Ripley, Chet and Connie's younger son
 Hilary Gordon and Rebecca Gordon as Cara and Mara Craig, Roman and Kate's twin daughters who are mostly silent until around the end of the film
 Zoaunne LeRoy as Juanita, the wife of Wally and co-owner of "Wally and Juanita's Perk's Pine Lodge Resort"
 Nancy Lenehan as a waitress
 John Bloom as Jimbo
 Lewis Arquette as Herm
 Britt Leach as Reg, a man who has been struck by lightning 66 times, then 67 near the end of the film
 Bart the Bear as Jody the Bald-Headed Bear, a grizzly bear who lost her fur on top of its head during a previous encounter with Chet. Bart's bear stunts are performed by Clint Youngreen and Gary Morgan.

Additional voices by Catherine Battistone, Bill Capizzi, Steve Kramer, Luisa Leschin, Wendy Oates, Thomas White, Tom Williams, and Marcia Wolf.

Filming

Filming locations
The film was shot on location in Bass Lake, California, a small resort town near Sierra National Forest over three weeks in October 1987 where it portrayed the fictional Lake Potowotominimac. Ducey's Bass Lake Lodge, a rustic 1940s resort, was featured as "Wally and Juanita's Perk's Pine Lodge Resort". The Loon's Nest vacation cabin, built on the backlot at Universal Studios, was designed to match the style of Ducey's existing cabins.

Production 
The film was shot under the working title "Big Country", but was changed to avoid confusion with Big which was due to come out at the same time.

In the original John Hughes script, Roman's redemption came through a daring rescue of his twin girls who had caught a giant fish that towed them around the lake in a small rowboat. A mechanical fish was built for the film. But when it could not be made to work correctly, the script was re-written around the legend of the bald-headed bear and the chase in the final act.

Reception
The Great Outdoors earned a mixed response from critics. On Rotten Tomatoes, the film holds a rating of 41% from 17 reviews, with an average rating of 4.9/10. On Metacritic, the film has a score of 24 out of 100 based on 10 reviews, indicating "generally unfavorable reviews." Audiences polled by CinemaScore gave the film an average grade of "B+" on an A+ to F scale.

In her review in The New York Times, Janet Maslin reported that the film did not have enough collective energy to light a campfire. Kevin Thomas of the Los Angeles Times called the film as "a crass, blah comedy about summer vacation perils" and said he was surprised the film got made at all. He described the end credits sequence where Aykroyd and Candy dance to Wilson Pickett's "Land of a Thousand Dances" as the only genuine fun and energy in the entire film. "Imagine that it's raining cats and dogs and you're locked in a north woods cabin for weeks with the people you like least, and you'll pretty much have a feel for what it's like to sit through this movie," said Hal Hinson of The Washington Post.

Box office
The film grossed $6,121,115 in its opening weekend and ended up with a North American domestic box office gross of $41,455,230, and a worldwide gross of $43,455,230.

Soundtrack
A soundtrack for the film was released by Atlantic Records in 1988 and featured many of the songs used in the film.

Other appearances
Before The Great Outdoors appeared in theaters, Dan Aykroyd, John Candy, and Chris Young portrayed their roles during the end credits of She's Having a Baby where they are among the people that pitch the idea names for the baby son of Jake and Kristy.

Reboot and sequel
On April 27, 2017, Universal Pictures announced that a reboot of the film starring Kevin Hart and produced by Michael De Luca was in development.

In a November 2, 2021 interview with The Hollywood Reporter, Aykroyd said that he was working on a sequel with Deutch titled The Great Outlaws that would "bring back Roman as a Ponzi scheme guy who victimizes a federal agent." In the interview, Aykroyd also said that he was "looking for the Candy figure" to cast in the film.

References

External links

 
 
 
 

1980s adventure comedy films
1988 comedy films
1988 films
American adventure comedy films
1980s English-language films
Films about dysfunctional families
Films about vacationing
Films directed by Howard Deutch
Films produced by John Hughes (filmmaker)
Films scored by Thomas Newman
Films set in Wisconsin
Films shot in California
Films with screenplays by John Hughes (filmmaker)
Universal Pictures films
1980s American films